In mathematical analysis, the Foias constant is a real number named after Ciprian Foias.

It is defined in the following way: for every real number x1 > 0, there is a sequence defined by the recurrence relation
 
for n = 1, 2, 3, ....  The Foias constant is the unique choice α such that if x1 = α then the sequence diverges to infinity.  For all other values of x1, the sequence is divergent as well, but it has two accumulation points: 1 and infinity.  Numerically, it is
 .
No closed form for the constant is known.

When x1 = α then the growth rate of the sequence (xn) is given by the limit
 
where "log" denotes the natural logarithm.

The same methods used in the proof of the uniqueness of the Foias constant may also be applied to other similar recursive sequences.

See also
Mathematical constant

Notes and references 

 

Mathematical analysis
Mathematical constants